The 1000 metres distance for men in the 2009–10 ISU Speed Skating World Cup was contested over seven races on six occasions, out of a total of seven World Cup occasions for the season, with the first occasion taking place in Berlin, Germany, on 6–8 November 2009, and the final occasion taking place in Heerenveen, Netherlands, on 12–14 March 2010.

Shani Davis of the United States successfully defended his title from the previous season by winning all races, while Mark Tuitert of the Netherlands came second, and Stefan Groothuis, also of the Netherlands, repeated his third place from the previous season.

Top three

Race medallists

Final standings
Standings as of 14 March 2010 (end of the season).

References

Standings

Men 1000